Antti Railio (born in 1983 or 1984) is a Finnish rock and pop rock singer and vocalist in a number of Finnish bands, notably the power metal band Celesty, in addition to Diecell and The WildFire. After reaching the semi-finals in Finnish Idols (2007), and taking part in Kuorosota (Finnish version of Clash of the Choirs), he took part in season 2 of the Finnish music competition The Voice of Finland carrying the title in the final held on 26 April 2013.

Musical career
Antti Railo started as a vocalist in the Finnish power metal band Celesty starting in 2003. During his six years in the band, Celesty released three albums, Legacy of Hate in 2004, Mortal Mind Creation in 2006 and Vendetta in 2009. He left the band just after the release of the album in 2009. While in Celesty, he also cooperated with band Diecell recording with them a demo, Audile Assault in 2005 and an EP Thrashborne in 2005.

In 2009 he moved to another band, The WildFire, releasing with them the album Sands Of Time, a promotional album

Musical competitions and reality shows
Railio has been very active in music competition shows and reality television programmes. First he took part in season 3 of the Finnish version of Idols in 2007 reaching the semi-final stage before being eliminated.

In 2009, he was in the inaugural season of Kuorosota, the Finnish version of Clash of the Choirs. The series was won by Timo Kotipelto.

The Voice of Finland
In 2013, Railio returned to competition with The Voice of Finland which started on January 4, 2013 on the Finnish television Nelonen. He was the first contestant to appear on the show singing "Who Wants to Live Forever" from Queen. All four judges, Elastinen, Lauri Tähkä, Paula Koivuniemi and Michael Monroe turned their seats. Railio opted to be with Team Paula. In the Battle Rounds, Paula put him against Daniela Persson. Both sang "(I Just) Died in Your Arms" and Paula picked Railio to moved to the next round. In the live rounds starting on March 15, 2013, he sang consecutively "Maniac", "Rebel Yell", "Romanssi" and "Minun tuulessa soi" and in the semi-finals, "Skyfall" advancing to the finals as Team Paula finalist, alongside Suvi Aalto (Team Michael), Emilia Ekström (Team Lauri) and Ike Ikegwuonu (Team Elastinen). The final was aired April 26, 2013 singing "Sulava jää" as solo and  "Kuuleeko yö" as a duo with his mentor Paula Koivuniemi. He carried the title with a high score of 124 out of a possible 200, against runner up Emilia Ekström with just 76 out of 200.

Solo career
After his win, Railio embarked on a solo career. His debut single "Vieras maa" entered at #3 on Suomen virallinen lista, the official Finnish Singles Chart in its first week of release.

Discography

Band appearances
In Celesty - Legacy of Hate (2004) / Mortal Mind Creation (2006) / Vendetta (2009)
In Diecell - Audile Assault (demo) (2005) / Thrashborne (EP) (2006)
In The WildFire - Sands of Time (Promo) (2011)
In Christmas compilations
Raskasta Joulua (2013) - "Enkelikello"/ "Tulkoon joulu"
Raskasta Joulua 2 (2014) - "Joulu Juhla Parahin"
Ragnarok Juletide (2014) - "We Celebrate At Christmastime" / "Christmas Has Come"
Tulkoon joulu – akustisesti (2015) - "Tulkoon joulu"
Jani Liimatainen - My Fathers Son (2022) / "My Fathers Son"

Singles

Singles Featured in

References

21st-century Finnish male singers
The Voice (franchise) winners
1984 births
Living people
People from Seinäjoki